The Health in Eritrea has been poor on a world scale.  Nevertheless, Eritrea is one of the few countries to be on target to meet its Millennium Development Goal (MDG) targets for health.  As of 2005, over two-thirds of the population lived below the national poverty line and the vast majority in rural areas, about one-third of the population lived in extreme poverty and more than half survived on less than US$1 per day.  Researchers at the Overseas Development Institute have identified the health and education as a high priority, both within the government and amongst Eritreans at home and abroad. Innovative multi-sectoral approaches to health were also identified with the success.

Resources
Health care and welfare resources generally are believed to be poor, although reliable information about conditions is often difficult to obtain. In 2001, the Eritrean government spent 5.7 percent of gross domestic product on national health accounts. The World Bank's World DataBank estimated that in 2004 there were only 50 physicians per 100,000 people in Eritrea, while the World Health Organization (WHO) estimated only 3. The two-year war with Ethiopia, coming on the heels of a 30-year struggle for independence, negatively affected the health sector and the general welfare. The rate of prevalence of human immunodeficiency virus/acquired immune deficiency syndrome (HIV/AIDS), although low by sub-Saharan African standards, was high enough at 2.7 percent in 2003 to be considered a generalized epidemic.

Between 1995 and 2005, impressive results were achieved. Life expectancy at birth has increased from 39.1 in 1960 to 59.5 years in 2008, maternal and child mortality rates have dropped dramatically and the health infrastructure has been expanded (please see table). In 2008 average life expectancy was slightly less than 53 years, according to the WHO. Immunisation and child nutrition has been tackled by working closely with schools in a multi-sectoral approach; the number of children vaccinated against measles almost doubled in seven years, from 40.7% to 78.5% and the underweight prevalence among children decreased by 12% in 1995–2002 (severe underweight prevalence by 28%). This has helped to some small extent even out rural-urban and rich-poor inequity in health.

Diseases
Malaria control is an important component of the Eritrean preventive health policy. The National Malaria Protection Unit of the Ministry of Health has registered tremendous improvements in reducing malarial mortality by as much as 85% and the number 
of cases by 92% between 1998 and 2006. These impressive gains are the result of the Ministry of Health "...running [a] strong and effective national programme..."

Hospitals

There were 272 medical facilities in Eritrea in 2019, including 22 hospitals listed below by type and location.  The Hanssenian National Referral Hospital is managed by a NGO and the rest are managed by the Ministry of Health of Eritrea.  The other 247 medical facilities are clinics and health centers managed by the Ministry of Health.  There is also a psychiatric hospital, St Mary's Psychiatric Hospital Sembel, in the Eritrean capital, Asmara, Central Region.

In 2003 Eritrea opened its first medical college in an effort to narrow the healthcare worker gap. By 2012 the medical college's graduates will triple the number of pediatricians and double the number of surgeons in Eritrea.

References

External links